CougarTech, FRC team 2228, is a FIRST Robotics Competition team that was founded in 2007, and is a school-based team from the Honeoye Falls-Lima Central School District in Honeoye Falls, New York. The team also represents the Rush–Henrietta Central School District in competition. During the six weeks of build season, the team builds a robot to play the year's new game that FIRST designs each year. During the off season, the team focuses work on public outreach, recruitment, fundraising and sponsorship to support their team and FIRST. Please refer to their website for more information about the current game or other information.

Awards
As of August 22, 2018.
 2019 Team Spirit Award - Buckeye Regional
 2019 Innovation in Control Award - Finger Lakes Regional
 2019 FIRST Dean's List Finalist Award (Ellie Fairchild) - Finger Lakes Regional
 2018 Imagery Award (Finger Lakes Regional)
 2017 Gracious Professionalism Award (Buckeye Regional)
 2017 Industrial Safety Award (Buckeye Regional)
 2016 Entrepreneurship Award sponsored by Kleiner Perkins Caufield and Byers (Finger Lakes Regional) 
 2016 Industrial Design Award sponsored by General Motors (Greater Toronto East Regional) 
 2016 Gracious Professionalism Award sponsored by Johnson & Johnson (Greater Toronto East Regional) 
 2015 Judges' Award (Finger Lakes Regional)
 2015 Industrial Design Award sponsored by General Motors (Greater Toronto East Regional)
 2014 Engineering Excellence Award sponsored by Delphi (Finger Lakes Regional)
 2014 FIRST Dean's List Finalist Award, Peter Carosa (Finger Lakes Regional)
 2012 Industrial Safety Award sponsored by Underwriters Laboratories (Buckeye Regional)
 2012 Entrepreneurship Award sponsored by Kleiner Perkins Caufield and Byers (Finger Lakes Regional)
 2011 Coopertition Award (Finger Lakes Regional)
 2011 Entrepreneurship Award sponsored by Kleiner Perkins Caufield and Byers (Finger Lakes Regional)
 2007 Rookie All Star Award (Finger Lakes Regional)
 2007 Highest Rookie Seed (Finger Lakes Regional)

References

External links 
 http://hflrobotics.com
 https://web.archive.org/web/20150302143811/http://frc2228.com/

FIRST Robotics Competition teams
Robotics organizations